Angélica is a municipality located in the Brazilian state of Mato Grosso do Sul. Its population was 10,932 (2020) and its area is 1,283 km².

References

Municipalities in Mato Grosso do Sul